Dookie is the third studio album and the major label debut by American rock band Green Day, released on February 1, 1994, by Reprise Records. The band's first collaboration with producer Rob Cavallo, it was recorded in late summer 1993 at Fantasy Studios in Berkeley, California. Written mostly by frontman Billie Joe Armstrong, the album is heavily based around his personal experiences, with themes such as boredom, anxiety, relationships, and sexuality. The album was promoted with five singles: "Longview", "Basket Case", a  version of "Welcome to Paradise" (originally on their Kerplunk album), "When I Come Around", and "She".

After several years dominated by grunge, the record brought a livelier, more melodic sound to the mainstream, with unassuming lyrics that reached a universal audience and propelled the band to worldwide popularity. Considered one of the defining albums of the 1990s and rock music as a whole, it also revived the general public's interest in punk rock. It would influence a new wave of groups connected to this movement, such as Blink-182, Sum 41, Rancid, and Fall Out Boy. Regarding its legacy, Dookie has been labeled by critics and journalists as one of the greatest punk rock and pop-punk albums of all time.

Dookie received critical acclaim upon its release and won the band a Grammy Award for Best Alternative Album in 1995. It was also a worldwide success, reaching number two in the United States and the top five in several other countries. It was later certified diamond by the RIAA, and has sold 20 million copies worldwide, making it the band's best-selling album and one of the best-selling albums worldwide. Rolling Stone has placed Dookie on three iterations of their list of the "500 Greatest Albums of All Time".

Background and recording
With the success in the independent world of their first two albums 39/Smooth (1990) and Kerplunk (1991), which sold 30,000 units each, a number of major record labels became interested in Green Day. Among those labels were Sony, Warner Bros., Geffen and Interscope. Representatives of these labels attempted to entice the band to sign by inviting them for meals to discuss a deal, with one manager even inviting the group to Disneyland. The band declined these advances because they wanted to maintain artistic control over their songs and did not want to conform to a label's vision, until they met producer and A&R representative Rob Cavallo of Reprise, a subsidiary of Warner Bros. After showcasing him 40 minutes of Beatles covers, Cavallo picked up his own guitar, and the band jammed together with Cavallo. They were further impressed by his work with fellow Californian band The Muffs, and later remarked that Cavallo "was the only person we could really talk to and connect with".

Eventually, the band left their independent record label, Lookout! Records, on friendly terms and signed to Reprise in 1993. Signing to a major label caused many of the band's original fans from the independent music club 924 Gilman Street to regard Green Day as sell-outs. The club banned Green Day from entering since the major label signing. Reflecting back on the period, lead vocalist Billie Joe Armstrong told Spin magazine in 1999, "I couldn't go back to the punk scene, whether we were the biggest success in the world or the biggest failure [...] The only thing I could do was get on my bike and go forward." The group later returned in 2015 to play a benefit concert.

Cavallo was chosen as the main producer of the album, with Jerry Finn as the mixer. Green Day originally gave the first demo tape to Cavallo, and after listening to it during the car ride home he sensed that "[he] had stumbled on something big." The band's recording session lasted three weeks, and the album was mixed twice. Armstrong said the band at first "wanted it to sound really dry, the same way the Sex Pistols record or the early Black Sabbath records sounded", but the band felt the original mix was unsatisfactory. Cavallo agreed, and it was remixed at Fantasy Studios in Berkeley, California. Armstrong later said of their studio experience, "Everything was already written, all we had to do was play it."

Writing and composition
Much of Dookies content was written by Armstrong, except "Emenius Sleepus" written by bassist Mike Dirnt, and the hidden track, "All by Myself", which was written by drummer Tré Cool. The album touched upon various experiences of the band members and included subjects like anxiety and panic attacks, masturbation, sexual orientation, boredom, mass murder, divorce, and ex-girlfriends. Stylistically, the album has been categorized primarily as punk rock, but also as pop-punk and as a "power pop take" on skate punk.

Songs 1–7

Armstrong wrote the song "Having a Blast" when he was in Cleveland in June 1992.
The single "Longview" had a signature bass line that bassist Dirnt wrote while under the influence of LSD. "Welcome to Paradise", the second single from Dookie, was originally on the band's second studio album, Kerplunk. The song was re-recorded with a less grainy sound for Dookie. The song never had an official music video; however, a certain live performance of the song is often associated as a music video. The video is located on Green Day's official website.

The hit single "Basket Case", which appeared on many singles charts worldwide, was also inspired by Armstrong's personal experiences. The song deals with Armstrong's anxiety attacks and feelings of "going crazy" prior to being diagnosed with a panic disorder.  In the third verse, "Basket Case" references soliciting a male prostitute; Armstrong noted that "I wanted to challenge myself and whoever the listener might be. It's also looking at the world and saying, 'It's not as black and white as you think. This isn't your grandfather's prostitute – or maybe it was.' "  The music video was filmed in an abandoned mental institution. It is one of the band's most popular songs.

Songs 8–14
"She" was written by Armstrong about a former girlfriend who showed him a feminist poem with an identical title. In return, Armstrong wrote the lyrics of "She" and showed them to her. She later moved to Ecuador, prompting Armstrong to put "She" on the album. The same ex-girlfriend is also the topic of the songs "Sassafras Roots" and "Chump".

The final single, "When I Come Around", was again inspired by a woman, though this time being about Armstrong's wife, then former girlfriend, Adrienne. Following a dispute between the couple, Armstrong left Adrienne to spend some time alone. The video featured the three band members walking around Berkeley and San Francisco at night, eventually ending up back at the original location. Future touring member of Green Day, Jason White, made a cameo in the video with his then-girlfriend. The song was the band's first top ten single at number 6 on the Hot 100 Airplay chart and stayed number 1 on the Modern Rock Tracks chart for 7 weeks (2 weeks longer than "Basket Case"). It also hit number 2 on both the Mainstream Rock Tracks and the Mainstream Top 40 charts. The song "Coming Clean" deals with Armstrong's coming to terms with his bisexuality when he was 16 and 17 years old. In his interview with The Advocate magazine, he stated that although he has never had a relationship with a man, his sexuality has been "something that comes up as a struggle in me". Armstrong wrote the song "In the End" about his mother and her husband. He is quoted saying: "That song is about my mother's husband, it's not really about a girl, or like anyone directly related to me in a relationship. In the End's about my mother."

A hidden track, "All By Myself", with vocals and guitar by Cool, plays after "F.O.D." ends, and is themed on masturbation.

Packaging
The name of the album is a reference to the band members often suffering from diarrhea, which they referred to as "liquid dookie", as a result of eating spoiled food while on tour. Initially the band was to name the album Liquid Dookie; however, this was deemed "too gross", and so they settled on the name Dookie.

The album artwork by fellow East Bay punk Richie Bucher caused controversy, since it depicted bombs being dropped on people and buildings. The setting is a replica of Berkeley's Telegraph Avenue. In the center, there is an explosion, with the band's name at the top.  Armstrong has since explained the meaning of the artwork:

The back cover on early prints of the CD featured a plush toy of Ernie from Sesame Street, which was airbrushed out of later prints for fear of litigation; however, Canadian and European prints still feature Ernie on the back cover. Some rumors suggest that it was removed because it led parents to think that Dookie was a child's lullaby album or that the creators of Sesame Street had sued Green Day.

Release
Dookie was released on February 1, 1994. Though the album only sold 9,000 copies in its first week, it eventually peaked at number two on the Billboard 200 in the United States and became an international success; the lowest peak in any country was in the United Kingdom at number 13. While all the singles from the album charted in a few countries, the hit single "Basket Case" entered the top 10 in the United Kingdom and Sweden. Later in 1995, the album received a Grammy Award for Best Alternative Music Album, with "Longview" and "Basket Case" each being nominated for a Grammy.

Throughout the 1990s, Dookie continued to sell well, eventually receiving diamond certification in 1999. By 2014, Dookie had sold over 20 million copies worldwide and remains the band's best-selling album.

Reception

Dookie was released to critical acclaim. Bill Lamb at About.com regards it as an album that only gets better with time, calling it "one of the landmark albums of the 1990s". Stephen Thomas Erlewine of AllMusic described Dookie as "a stellar piece of modern punk that many tried to emulate but nobody bettered". In 1994, Time claimed Dookie as the third best album of the year, and the best rock album of 1994. Jon Pareles from The New York Times, in early 1995, described the sound of Dookie as, "Punk turns into pop in fast, funny, catchy, high-powered songs about whining and channel-surfing; apathy has rarely sounded so passionate." Rolling Stones Paul Evans described Green Day as "convincing mainly because they've got punk's snotty anti-values down cold: blame, self-pity, arrogant self-hatred, humor, narcissism, fun".

Neil Strauss of The New York Times, while complimentary of the album's overall quality, noted that Dookies pop sound only remotely resembled punk music. The band did not respond initially to these comments, but later claimed that they were "just trying to be themselves" and that "it's our band, we can do whatever we want". Dirnt claimed that the follow-up album, Insomniac, one of the band's most aggressive albums lyrically and musically, was the band releasing their anger at all the criticism from critics and former fans.

Along with The Offspring's Smash, Dookie has been credited for helping bring punk rock back into mainstream music culture. Thomas Nassiff at Fuse cited it as the most important pop-punk album. Rolling Stone has cited it as one of the greatest punk rock albums of all time.

In April 2014, Rolling Stone placed the album at No. 1 on its "1994: The 40 Best Records From Mainstream Alternative's Greatest Year" list. A month later, Loudwire placed Dookie at No. 1 on its "10 Best Hard Rock Albums of 1994" list. Guitar World ranked Dookie at number thirteen in their list "Superunknown: 50 Iconic Albums That Defined 1994".

Accolades

Since its release, Dookie has been featured heavily in various "must have" lists compiled by the music media. Some of the more prominent of these lists to feature Dookie are shown below.

Live performances

Immediately following the release of Dookie, the band embarked on an international tour, beginning in the United States, for which they used a bookmobile belonging to Tré Cool's father to travel between shows. An audience of millions saw Green Day's performance at Woodstock '94 on Pay-per-view, helping the band attract more fans. This event was the location of the infamous mud "fight" between the band and the crowd, which continued beyond the end of Green Day's set. During the fight, Dirnt was mistaken for a fan by a security guard, who tackled him and then threw him against a monitor, causing him to injure his arm and break two of his teeth.

The band also appeared at Lollapalooza and the Z100 Acoustic Christmas at Madison Square Garden, where Armstrong performed the song "She" entirely naked due to him not knowing if they'll ever perform there again. Having toured throughout the United States and Canada, the band played a few shows in Europe before beginning the recording sessions for the subsequent album, Insomniac. During the tour, Armstrong was quite homesick. His wife, Adrienne Armstrong, whom he had married shortly after the release of Dookie, was pregnant during most of the tour, and Armstrong was upset about being unable to help and care for her.

In 2013, Dookie was played in its entirety at select European dates as a celebration of the album's upcoming 20th anniversary.

Track listing
All lyrics written by Billie Joe Armstrong, except where noted; all music composed by Green Day.

PersonnelGreen Day Billie Joe Armstrong – lead vocals, guitar
 Mike Dirnt – bass, backing vocals
 Tré Cool – drums, guitar and lead vocals on "All by Myself"Technical personnel'''
 Rob Cavallo, Green Day – producer, mixing
 Jerry Finn – mixing
 Neill King – engineer
 Casey McCrankin – engineer
 Richie Bucher – cover artist
 Ken Schles – photography
 Pat Hynes – booklet artwork

Charts

 Weekly charts 

 Year-end charts 

 Decade-end charts 

Certifications

References

Citations

Sources

 
 
 
 
 
 
 
 
 
 
 
 

External links

Dookie at YouTube (streamed copy where licensed)Dookie'' at Discogs

1994 albums
Albums produced by Rob Cavallo
Grammy Award for Best Alternative Music Album
Green Day albums
Reprise Records albums
Skate punk albums